Maat Mons is a massive shield volcano on the planet Venus and the planet's second-highest mountain and highest volcano. It is named after the Egyptian goddess of truth and justice, Ma'at.

Structure
Maat Mons has a large summit caldera, 28×31 km in size. Within the large caldera, there are at least five smaller collapse craters, up to 10 km in diameter.

A chain of small craters 3–5 km in diameter extends some 40 km along the southeast flank of the volcano, but rather than indicating a large fissure eruption, they seem to also be formed by collapse: full resolution imagery from the Magellan probe reveals no evidence of lava flows from these craters.

At least two large scale structural collapse events seem to have occurred in the past on Maat Mons.

Activity
Radar sounding by Magellan probe revealed evidence for comparatively recent volcanic activity at Maat Mons, in the form of ash flows near the summit and on the northern flank.

Intriguingly for planetary geologists, atmospheric studies carried out by the Pioneer Venus probes in the early 1980s revealed a considerable variation in the concentrations of sulfur dioxide (SO2) and methane (CH4) in Venus' middle and upper atmosphere.  One possible explanation for this was the injection of volcanic gases into the atmosphere by plinian eruptions at Maat Mons.

More recent studies have suggested that the volcano structure, distribution of lava flows, pit craters, summit morphology, and other small-scale features are indicative of recent volcanic activity on Maat Mons.

Although many lines of evidence suggest that Venus is likely to be volcanically active, present-day eruptions at Maat Mons have not been confirmed.

See also 
List of montes on Venus
Volcanism on Venus

References

External links
3D Perspective View of Maat Mons

Volcanoes of Venus
Mountains on Venus
Polygenetic shield volcanoes